Ali Asghar was an Iranian court painter in Safavid Iran. He was the father of the renowned miniaturist Reza Abbasi.

Biography
Ali Asghar was a native of Kashan. According to the accounts of Qazi Ahmad, Ali Asghar was one of his (Qazi Ahmad) teachers in miniature painting. He probably began his career under Safavid Shah Tahmasp I (1524-1576), before moving to Mashhad where he became one of the leading painters in the service of the princely governor Ibrahim Mirza, alongside Sheikh Mohammad and Abd-Allah. 

According to the court historian Iskandar Beg Munshi, Ali Asghar excelled in landscape painting (streets and trees). He later worked for Shah Ismail II (1576-1577) at the Safavid capital of Qazvin. His style probably influenced the early works of his illustrious son Reza Abbasi.

References

Sources
 
 
 

People from Kashan
16th-century painters of Safavid Iran
Court painters
16th-century Iranian painters